Mark Moran (born September 26, 1954) is a retired American soccer  midfielder who played in the North American Soccer League.

In 1973, Moran graduated from St. Thomas Aquinas-Mercy High School in St. Louis, Missouri. He then attended Southern Illinois University, Edwardsville, playing on the men's soccer team from 1973 to 1976. In 1977, he turned professional with the Minnesota Kicks of the North American Soccer League. He played five outdoor and two indoor seasons in Minnesota.   
After ending his soccer career he moved back to St. Louis, MO, and began a career as a CRNA. He remains there with his wife and children, and continues to help coach in his grandkids' soccer leagues.

References

External links
 NASL stats

1954 births
Living people
American soccer players
Minnesota Kicks players
North American Soccer League (1968–1984) indoor players
North American Soccer League (1968–1984) players
SIU Edwardsville Cougars men's soccer players
Soccer players from St. Louis
Association football midfielders